The Zaniolepididae is a family of marine ray-finned fishes classified within the suborder Cottoidei of the order Scorpaeniformes. They are found in the North Pacific Ocean.

Taxonomy
Zaniolepididae was first proposed as a family in 1883 by the American ichthyologists David Starr Jordan and Charles Henry Gilbert. this taxon has been classified as the subfamily Zaniolepinae within the Hexagrammidae. This family is classified within its own superfamily, the Zaniolepidoidea, within the suborder Cottoidei of the Scorpaeniformes. Other workers have found that if the Scorpaeniformes, as delimited in Fishes of the World, is not included in the Perciformes it renders the Perciformes paraphyletic. These workers retain the Cottoidei as a suborder within the Perciformes while reclassifying Zaniolepidoidea as the infraorder Zaniolepidoales.

Subfamilies and genera
Zaniolepididae has 2 genera classified within it, each within its own monotypic subfamily:

 Subfamily Oxylebiinae Gill, 1862
 Oxylebius Gill, 1862 (painted greenlet)
 Subfamily Zaniolepidinae Jordan & Gilbert 1883 
 Zaniolepis Gilbert, 1858 (combfishes)

Characteristics
Zaniolepididae is characterised by having an incision between the first and second dorsal fins and by having an anal fin with 3 or 4 spines. The caudal fin may be rounded or truncate, there is one complete lateral line and the scales are ctenoid.

Distribution
Zaniolepidiae are endemic to the eastern North Pacific Ocean from Alaska south to Baja California.

Utilization
Zaniolepididae has one species, Zaniolepis frenata, which has been recorded as a source of food for the Native American inhabitants of San Nicolas Island off the coast of Southern California during the Middle Holocene.

References

Cottoidei
 
Ray-finned fish families
Taxa named by David Starr Jordan